Lanao del Norte's at-large congressional district is an obsolete congressional district that encompassed the entire territory of Lanao del Norte in the Philippines. It was represented in the House of Representatives from 1961 to 1972 and in the Batasang Pambansa from 1984 to 1986. The province of Lanao del Norte was created as a result of the division of Lanao in 1959 and elected its first representative provincewide at-large during the 1961 Philippine House of Representatives elections. Laurentino Lluch Badelles who served as representative of Lanao's at-large congressional district during the partition was elected as this district's first representative. The district remained a single-member district until the dissolution of the lower house in 1972. It was later absorbed by the multi-member Region XII's at-large district for the national parliament in 1978. In 1984, provincial and city representations were restored and Lanao del Norte returned one member for the regular parliament with a separate representation created for its highly-urbanized city of Iligan. The district was abolished following the 1987 reapportionment that established two districts in the province under a new constitution.

Representation history

See also
Legislative districts of Lanao del Norte

References

Former congressional districts of the Philippines
Politics of Lanao del Norte
1961 establishments in the Philippines
1972 disestablishments in the Philippines
1984 establishments in the Philippines
1986 disestablishments in the Philippines
At-large congressional districts of the Philippines
Congressional districts of Northern Mindanao
Constituencies established in 1961
Constituencies disestablished in 1972
Constituencies established in 1984
Constituencies disestablished in 1986